This article is about the particular significance of the year 1717 to Wales and its people.

Incumbents
Lord Lieutenant of North Wales (Lord Lieutenant of Anglesey, Caernarvonshire, Denbighshire, Flintshire, Merionethshire, Montgomeryshire) – Hugh Cholmondeley, 1st Earl of Cholmondeley 
Lord Lieutenant of Glamorgan – vacant until 1729
Lord Lieutenant of Brecknockshire and Lord Lieutenant of Monmouthshire – John Morgan (of Rhiwpera)
Lord Lieutenant of Cardiganshire – John Vaughan, 1st Viscount Lisburne
Lord Lieutenant of Carmarthenshire – vacant until 1755
Lord Lieutenant of Pembrokeshire – Sir Arthur Owen, 3rd Baronet
Lord Lieutenant of Radnorshire – Thomas Coningsby, 1st Earl Coningsby

Bishop of Bangor – Benjamin Hoadly
Bishop of Llandaff – John Tyler
Bishop of St Asaph – John Wynne
Bishop of St Davids – Adam Ottley

Events
31 March - In the presence of King George I of Great Britain, Benjamin Hoadly, Bishop of Bangor, gives a sermon on "The Nature of the Kingdom of Christ", beginning the Bangorian Controversy.
19 September - Japanning of tinplate begins at Pontypool.
date unknown 
The Lower Swansea valley's first copper smelting works is opened by John Lane and John Pollard (possibly his step father-in-law) at Llangyfelach, Landore.
Welsh-born David Lloyd is appointed Chief Justice of the supreme court of Pennsylvania.

Arts and literature

New books

English language
James Davies – Particular Thoughts on Religion
Benjamin Hoadly – The Nature of the Kingdom, or Church of Christ

Welsh language
Meddylieu Neillduol ar Grefydd
Moses Williams –  (first-ever catalogue of Welsh printed books)

Births
11 February - William Williams (Pantycelyn), poet, hymn-writer and religious leader (died 1791)
13 November - Prince George William, first child born to the new Prince and Princess of Wales, George and Caroline, since their arrival in Britain (died 1718)

Deaths
20 May - John Trevor, politician, 80?
3 June - Thomas Watson, former Bishop of St David's, 80
30 August - William Lloyd, former Bishop of St Asaph, 90
date unknown - William Robinson, MP, about 50

See also
1717 in Scotland

References

1710s in Wales
Years of the 18th century in Wales